Warhem (from Flemish; Warrem in modern Dutch spelling) is a commune in the Nord department in northern France, near the border with Belgium.

Heraldry

Population

See also
Communes of the Nord department

References

Communes of Nord (French department)
French Flanders